Highlands School may refer to:

Highlands School, Grange Park, Middlesex, UK
The Highlands School, Reading, England
Highlands Primary School, Redbridge, England
Highlands School (North Carolina), Highlands, North Carolina, US
The Highlands School, Irving, Texas, US

See also
Highland Hills Middle School, Georgetown, Indiana, US
Highlands Elementary School (disambiguation)
Highland High School (disambiguation)
Highland Secondary School (disambiguation)